Wyoming East High School is a consolidated regional high school in New Richmond, West Virginia serving the eastern half of Wyoming County, West Virginia. It opened in 1998 and consolidated the former Pineville High School and Mullens High School, also taking in the former Herndon High School and about two-thirds of the attendance area of the former Glen Rogers High School, both of which had been closed several years earlier.  It also celebrates the academic and athletic heritage of Conley High School, which was the county's segregated school and had closed in 1964.

Athletics

Wyoming East sports teams are known as the Warriors and the Lady Warriors.

Wyoming East High School won the AA basketball State Championships in 2002, 2007, and 2008, and was runner-up in 2009 and 2010.

The Warriors basketball Team won the AA State Basketball Tournament in 2002, 2007 and 2008.

In 1999, in just its second year, the Warrior football team had a perfect season of 14-0 and won the AA Football State Championship.

The Warriors baseball team won the AA State Baseball Championship in 2012.

The Wyoming East golf team won the State Championships in 2006 and 2008.

The Lady Warriors basketball team won the 2016 State Girls AA Basketball Championship in 2016.

References

https://www.register-herald.com/news/area-bands-bring-on-color-and-pageantry/article_a2838719-d051-57ed-8847-217c60c0f643.html

Educational institutions established in 1998
Public high schools in West Virginia
Education in Wyoming County, West Virginia
Buildings and structures in Wyoming County, West Virginia
1998 establishments in West Virginia